Heckert is a surname. Notable people with the surname include:

Michael Heckert (born 1950), German painter
Tom Heckert Jr. (born 1967), American football coach and executive, son of Tom
Tom Heckert Sr. (born 1938), American football coach, scout, and executive

See also
 Hecker (surname)